Ben Cartwright may refer to:

 Ben Cartwright (actor) (born 1976), British television actor, active since 2001
 Ben Cartwright, a cattle rancher played by Lorne Greene in the American western television show Bonanza, 1959–1973